Freedom in the Groove is a 1996 studio album by American jazz saxophonist Joshua Redman.

Reception
Leo Stanley of AllMusic stated: "Abandoning the traditional hard bop that has dominated his past recordings, Redman attempts to work himself into hip-hop and urban dance rhythms, which results in an occasionally intriguing but often frustrating album. Occasionally, the fusions work, with Redman contributing sympathetic, graceful licks to the gently insistent rhythms. Too often, the record sounds forced and stilted, which is unfortunate, since jazz/hip-hop fusion need a musician of Redman's caliber to make it credible in the jazz world."

Track listing
All songs were written and arranged by Joshua Redman.
 "Hide and Seek"
 "One Shining Soul"
 "Streams of Consciousness"
 "When the Sun Comes Down"
 "Home Fries"
 "Invocation"
 "Dare I Ask?"
 "Cat Battles"
 "Pantomime"
 "Can't Dance"

Personnel
 Joshua Redman – Tenor (1, 3-5, 7-8), Soprano (2, 9), Alto (6, 10)
 Peter Bernstein - Guitar
 Peter Martin – Piano
 Christopher Thomas – Bass
 Brian Blade – Drums

References

External links
 

Joshua Redman albums
1996 albums
Warner Records albums
Albums produced by Matt Pierson